Radha Kumari was an Indian veteran film actress who appeared in Telugu-language films. She acted in over 600 films in over four decades. She is well known for her humor and played mother or grandmother roles in most of her films.

Film career
Radha Kumari was born in 1942 in a Padmashali family at Vizianagaram. She began her career as a stage actress at the age of 12 and had played various roles in about 10,000 plays. She married Raavi Kondala Rao, an actor and writer, after she entered into the film industry. She made her debut in the film Tene Manasulu with Raavi Kondala Rao and had played the on-screen wife and husband roles in over 100 films. Seen as the best choice to play good-hearted roles, she acted with top heroes of two generations.  She won the "Nandi" award for her role in the film Mee Sreyobhilashi.

Filmography

Death
She died on 8 March 2012 in the early hours, due to cardiac arrest. She was survived by her husband Raavi Kondala Rao and her son.

References

External links 
 

1942 births
2012 deaths
Date of birth missing
Place of birth missing
Actresses in Telugu cinema
Indian film actresses
Actresses from Andhra Pradesh
20th-century Indian actresses
21st-century Indian actresses
People from Vizianagaram
Indian stage actresses
Actresses in Telugu theatre
People from Uttarandhra